Va or Wa is a consonant of Indic abugidas. In modern Indic scripts, Va is derived from the early "Ashoka" Brahmi letter  after having gone through the Gupta letter . It is generally romanized as "Va" in scripts for Indic languages, but as "Wa" in many scripts for other language families.

Āryabhaṭa numeration

Aryabhata used Devanagari letters for numbers, very similar to the Greek numerals, even after the invention of Indian numerals. The values of the different forms of व are: 
व  = 60 (६०)
वि  = 6,000 (६ ०००)
वु  = 600,000 (६ ०० ०००)
वृ  = 60,000,000 (६ ०० ०० ०००)
वॢ  = 6 (६×१०९)
वे  = 6 (६×१०११)
वै  = 6 (६×१०१३)
वो  = 6 (६×१०१५)
वौ  = 6 (६×१०१७)

Historic Va
There are three different general early historic scripts - Brahmi and its variants, Kharoṣṭhī, and Tocharian, the so-called slanting Brahmi. Va as found in standard Brahmi,  was a simple geometric shape, with variations toward more flowing forms by the Gupta . The Tocharian Va  had an alternate Fremdzeichen form, . The third form of va, in Kharoshthi was probably derived from Aramaic separately from the Brahmi letter.

Brahmi Va
The Brahmi letter , Va, is probably derived from the Aramaic Waw , and is thus related to the modern Latin F, V, U, W, Y, and Greek Upsilon. There are numerous distinguishable Brahmi Va writing styles, most of which are connected to a collection of inscriptions from an artifact or a variety of documents from a historical era. As the earliest and most geometric style of Brahmi, the letters found on the Edicts of Ashoka and other records from around that time are normally the reference form for Brahmi letters, with vowel marks not attested until later forms of Brahmi back-formed to match the geometric writing style.

Tocharian Va
The Tocharian letter  is derived from the Brahmi , and has an alternate Fremdzeichen form  used in conjuncts and as an alternate representation of Vä.

Kharoṣṭhī Va
The Kharoṣṭhī letter  is generally accepted as being derived from the Aramaic Waw , and is thus related to F, V, U, W, Y, and Upsilon, in addition to the Brahmi Va.

Devanagari Va

Va (व) is a consonant of the Devanagari abugida. It ultimately arose from the Brahmi letter , after having gone through the Gupta letter . Letters that derive from it are the Gujarati letter વ, and the Modi letter 𑘪.

Devanagari-using Languages
Like all Indic scripts, Devanagari uses vowel marks attached to the base consonant to override the inherent /ə/ vowel:

Conjuncts with व

Devanagari exhibits conjunct ligatures, as is common in Indic scripts. In modern Devanagari texts, most conjuncts are formed by reducing the letter shape to fit tightly to the following letter, usually by dropping a character's vertical stem, sometimes referred to as a "half form". Some conjunct clusters are always represented by a true ligature, instead of a shape that can be broken into constituent independent letters. Vertically stacked conjuncts are ubiquitous in older texts, while only a few are still used routinely in modern Devanagari texts. The use of ligatures and vertical conjuncts may vary across languages using the Devanagari script, with Marathi in particular preferring the use of half forms where texts in other languages would show ligatures and vertical stacks.

Ligature conjuncts of व
True ligatures are quite rare in Indic scripts. The most common ligated conjuncts in Devanagari are in the form of a slight mutation to fit in context or as a consistent variant form appended to the adjacent characters. Those variants include Na and the Repha and Rakar forms of Ra. Nepali and Marathi texts use the "eyelash" Ra half form  for an initial "R" instead of repha.
 Repha र্ (r) + व (va) gives the ligature : 

 Eyelash र্ (r) + व (va) gives the ligature :

 व্ (v) + न (na) gives the ligature :

 व্ (v) + rakar र (ra) gives the ligature :

 द্ (d) + ध্ (dʱ) + व (va) gives the ligature :

 द্ (d) + व (va) gives the ligature :

 द্ (d) + व্ (v) + य (ya) gives the ligature :

 Repha र্ (r) + द্ (d) + व (va) gives the ligature :

Stacked conjuncts of व
Vertically stacked ligatures are the most common conjunct forms found in Devanagari text. Although the constituent characters may need to be stretched and moved slightly in order to stack neatly, stacked conjuncts can be broken down into recognizable base letters, or a letter and an otherwise standard ligature.
 ब্ (b) + व (va) gives the ligature :

 छ্ (cʰ) + व (va) gives the ligature :

 च্ (c) + व (va) gives the ligature :

 ढ্ (ḍʱ) + व (va) gives the ligature :

 ड্ (ḍ) + व (va) gives the ligature :

 ह্ (h) + व (va) gives the ligature :

 झ্ (jʰ) + व (va) gives the ligature :

 ज্ (j) + ज্ (j) + व (va) gives the ligature :

 ख্ (kʰ) + व (va) gives the ligature :

 क্ (k) + त্ (t) + व (va) gives the ligature :

 क্ (k) + व (va) gives the ligature :

 ळ্ (ḷ) + व (va) gives the ligature :

 ल্ (l) + व (va) gives the ligature :

 ङ্ (ŋ) + व (va) gives the ligature :

 ञ্ (ñ) + व (va) gives the ligature :

 फ্ (pʰ) + व (va) gives the ligature :

 Repha र্ (r) + स্ (s) + व (va) gives the ligature :

 श্ (ʃ) + व (va) gives the ligature :

 ष্ (ṣ) + ट্ (ṭ) + व (va) gives the ligature :

 स্ (s) + व (va) gives the ligature :

 ठ্ (ṭʰ) + व (va) gives the ligature :

 ट্ (ṭ) + व (va) gives the ligature :

 त্ (t) + त্ (t) + व (va) gives the ligature :

 त্ (t) + व (va) gives the ligature :

 व্ (v) + ब (ba) gives the ligature :

 व্ (v) + च (ca) gives the ligature :

 व্ (v) + छ (cʰa) gives the ligature :

 व্ (v) + ड (ḍa) gives the ligature :

 व্ (v) + ग (ga) gives the ligature :

 व্ (v) + ज (ja) gives the ligature :

 व্ (v) + ज্ (j) + ञ (ña) gives the ligature :

 व্ (v) + क (ka) gives the ligature :

 व্ (v) + ल (la) gives the ligature :

 व্ (v) + ङ (ŋa) gives the ligature :

 व্ (v) + ञ (ña) gives the ligature :

 व্ (v) + व (va) gives the ligature :

Bengali Va
The Bengali script ব is derived from the Siddhaṃ , and is marked by a similar horizontal head line, but less geometric shape, than its Devanagari counterpart, व. Unlike many of its cognates in other Indic scripts, ব is primarily identified as the /b/ consonant, especially as an independent consonant. It tends to have no inherent pronunciation itself when in a non-head position of a conjuct conjunct, often serving as an indication of gemination (doubling) of the preceding consonant sound, although there are a few words where it retains its /b/ pronunciation.
Like all Indic consonants, ব can be modified by marks to indicate another (or no) vowel than its inherent "a".

ব in Bengali-using languages
ব is used as a basic consonant character in all of the major Bengali script orthographies, including Bengali and Assamese.

Conjuncts with non-head ব
Bengali ব exhibits conjunct ligatures, as is common in Indic scripts, with a tendency towards stacked ligatures. When used as the head (first) consonant in a conjunct, ব is normally pronounced as /b/.

Bengali Va-phala

Like Ra and Ya, the Bengali Va is almost always realized in a reduced form called "Va phala" (vo pholo) when found as the final consonant of a conjunct. This reduced form is appended at the bottom of a vertical stem, or otherwise attached at the bottom of a preceding consonant or conjunct.
 ভ্ (bʰ) + ব (va) gives the ligature :

 চ্ (c) + ছ্ (cʰ) + ব (va) gives the ligature :

 চ্ (c) + ব (va) gives the ligature :

 ড্ (ḍ) + ব (va) gives the ligature :

 দ্ (d) + দ্ (d) + ব (va) gives the ligature :

 দ্ (d) + ব (va) gives the ligature :

 গ্ (g) + ব (va) gives the ligature :

 জ্ (j) + জ্ (j) + ব (va) gives the ligature :

 জ্ (j) + ব (va) gives the ligature :

 খ্ (kʰ) + ব (va) gives the ligature :

 ক্ (k) + ষ্ (ṣ) + ব (va) gives the ligature :

 ক্ (k) + ব (va) gives the ligature :

 ল্ (l) + ব (va) gives the ligature :

 ম্ (m) + ব (va) gives the ligature :

 ন্ (n) + দ্ (d) + ব (va) gives the ligature :

 ন্ (n) + ত্ (t) + ব (va) gives the ligature :

 ন্ (n) + ব (va) gives the ligature :

 র্ (r) + দ্ (d) + ব (va) gives the ligature , with repha in addition to va phala:

 র্ (r) + শ্ (ʃ) + ব (va) gives the ligature , with repha in addition to va phala:

 শ্ (ʃ) + ব (va) gives the ligature :

 ষ্ (ṣ) + ব (va) gives the ligature :

 স্ (s) + ত্ (t) + ব (va) gives the ligature :

 স্ (s) + ব (va) gives the ligature :

 থ্ (tʰ) + ব (va) gives the ligature :

 ট্ (ṭ) + ব (va) gives the ligature :

 ত্ (t) + ত্ (t) + ব (va) gives the ligature :

 ত্ (t) + ব (va) gives the ligature :

Other ব conjuncts
A few letters conjoin with ব by keeping it in its full form instead of the reduced Va-phala.
 ধ্ (dʱ) + ব (va) gives the ligature  with full-form va:

 র্ (r) + ধ্ (dʱ) + ব (va) gives the ligature , with repha:

 ম্ (m) + ব্ (v) + র (ra) gives the ligature , with the ra phala suffix. Note that this is a different base conjunct than mva, above:

Gujarati Va

Va (વ) is the twenty-ninth consonant of the Gujarati abugida. It is derived from the Devanagari Va  with the top bar (shiro rekha) removed, and ultimately the Brahmi letter .

Gujarati-using Languages
The Gujarati script is used to write the Gujarati and Kutchi languages. Like all Indic scripts, Gujarati uses vowel marks attached to the base consonant to override the inherent /ə/ vowel:

Conjuncts with વ

Gujarati વ exhibits conjunct ligatures, much like its parent Devanagari Script. Most Gujarati conjuncts can only be formed by reducing the letter shape to fit tightly to the following letter, usually by dropping a character's vertical stem, sometimes referred to as a "half form". A few conjunct clusters can be represented by a true ligature, instead of a shape that can be broken into constituent independent letters, and vertically stacked conjuncts can also be found in Gujarati, although much less commonly than in Devanagari.
True ligatures are quite rare in Indic scripts. The most common ligated conjuncts in Gujarati are in the form of a slight mutation to fit in context or as a consistent variant form appended to the adjacent characters. Those variants include Na and the Repha and Rakar forms of Ra.
 ર્ (r) + વ (va) gives the ligature :

 વ્ (v) + ર (ra) gives the ligature :

 ટ્ (ʈ) + વ (va) gives the ligature :

 ડ્ (ɖ) + વ (va) gives the ligature :

 દ્ (d) + વ (va) gives the ligature :

 વ્ (v) + ન (na) gives the ligature :

 શ્ (ʃ) + વ (va) gives the ligature :

 હ્ (h) + વ (va) gives the ligature :

Telugu Va

Va (వ) is a consonant of the Telugu abugida. It ultimately arose from the Brahmi letter . It is closely related to the Kannada letter ವ. Most Telugu consonants contain a v-shaped headstroke that is related to the horizontal headline found in other Indic scripts, although headstrokes do not connect adjacent letters in Telugu. The headstroke is normally lost when adding vowel matras.
Telugu conjuncts are created by reducing trailing letters to a subjoined form that appears below the initial consonant of the conjunct. Many subjoined forms are created by dropping their headline, with many extending the end of the stroke of the main letter body to form an extended tail reaching up to the right of the preceding consonant. This subjoining of trailing letters to create conjuncts is in contrast to the leading half forms of Devanagari and Bengali letters. Ligature conjuncts are not a feature in Telugu, with the only non-standard construction being an alternate subjoined form of Ṣa (borrowed from Kannada) in the KṢa conjunct.

Malayalam Va

Va (വ) is a consonant of the Malayalam abugida. It ultimately arose from the Brahmi letter , via the Grantha letter  Va. Like in other Indic scripts, Malayalam consonants have the inherent vowel "a", and take one of several modifying vowel signs to represent syllables with another vowel or no vowel at all.

Conjuncts of വ
As is common in Indic scripts, Malayalam joins letters together to form conjunct consonant clusters. There are several ways in which conjuncts are formed in Malayalam texts: using a post-base form of a trailing consonant placed under the initial consonant of a conjunct, a combined ligature of two or more consonants joined, a conjoining form that appears as a combining mark on the rest of the conjunct, the use of an explicit candrakkala mark to suppress the inherent "a" vowel, or a special consonant form called a "chillu" letter, representing a bare consonant without the inherent "a" vowel. Texts written with the modern reformed Malayalam orthography, put̪iya lipi, may favor more regular conjunct forms than older texts in paḻaya lipi, due to changes undertaken in the 1970s by the Government of Kerala.
 വ് (v) + വ (va) gives the ligature :

Odia Wa

Wa (ୱ) is a consonant of the Odia abugida. It ultimately arose from the Brahmi letter , via the Siddhaṃ letter  Va. Like in other Indic scripts, Odia consonants have the inherent vowel "a", and take one of several modifying vowel signs to represent syllables with another vowel or no vowel at all.

As is common in Indic scripts, Odia joins letters together to form conjunct consonant clusters. The most common conjunct formation is achieved by using a small subjoined form of trailing consonants. Most consonants' subjoined forms are identical to the full form, just reduced in size, although a few drop the curved headline or have a subjoined form not directly related to the full form of the consonant. Wa shares its subjoined form with Ba, called "Ba Phala" or "Wa Phala" depending on its pronunciation in context. Ba is the character normally used for the /w/ and /v/ sounds of the letter Wa. ୱ generates conjuncts only by subjoining and does not form ligatures.

Khmer Vo

Vo (វ) is a consonant of the Khmer abugida. It ultimately arose from the Brahmi letter , via the Pallava letter  Va.  Like in other Indic scripts, Khmer consonants have the inherent vowel "a", and take one of several modifying vowel signs to represent syllables with another vowel.  Actually, the sounds of the vowels are modified by the consonant; see the article on the Khmer writing system for details.

As in the Thai, Lao and Tai Tham scripts, Va served as a mater lectionis representing the sound /ua/.  In this rôle, it was subscripted.  In Cambodian usage, a new form of subscript was developed for consonantal usage, and the two are now used contrastively.

Tai Tham Wa

Wa is a consonant of the Tai Tham abugida. It ultimately arose from the Brahmi letter , via the Pallava letter  Va.  Like in other Indic scripts, Tai Tham consonants have the inherent vowel "a", and take one of several modifying vowel signs to represent syllables with another vowel.

Thus Wa may appear as the 'base' consonant with almost any other consonant.  Northern Thai traditionally allows it to form an initial consonant cluster with almost any other consonant sound, it can act as a mater lectionis (as shown in the list of matras above for Vūa), and it can be a final consonant, as in the fairly common rime -iv, e.g.  'to be hungry'.  To accommodate a lack of space below the base consonants, there are several strategies:

 Subscript Wa can be written significantly smaller than usual, typically at the size of anusvara.  Certain other consonants also exhibit vertically compressed subscript forms, most notably La and Nga.
 Subscript Wa can be nested within subscript Ma and Na, e.g. Northern Thai  <hmūaḍ> /muːat/ 'to twist'.
 A sequence of subscript items can be written horizontally, rather than vertically.  This sequence can continue beneath another base consonant.  It can sometime be hard to see that the second subscript belongs with the first consonant rather than the second.
 For several letters, including Wa, if the space below the base letter is occupied, a final consonant can be written above instead.  The result for Wa is frequently indistinguishable from anusvara, and is currently encoded the same, namely as TAI THAM SIGN MAI KANG.  It occurs in the sequence <Ya, Wa>, as in the Tai Lue word  '(just) one', where the subscripted letter Ya is used as a mater lectionis.  This practice is extremely rare for Wa in Northern Thai.

For example, Northern Thai <hlūaṅ> 'big' can be written as:
  - two stacks of (1) ha, la, wa all stacked vertically and (2) ṅa;
  - two stacks: (1) a bent stack of ha, la below ha, wa to the right of la and (2) the single character ṅa.  Visually, this is only subtly different from the meaningless two stacks of (1) ha, la and (2) ṅa, wa - ;
  - two stacks of (1) ha, la and (2) wa,  ṅa; 

The first two alternatives have the same encoding in Unicode; the font and its configuration determine the rendering.

Comparison of Va
The various Indic scripts are generally related to each other through adaptation and borrowing, and as such the glyphs for cognate letters, including Va, are related as well.

Character encodings of Va
Most Indic scripts are encoded in the Unicode Standard, and as such the letter Va in those scripts can be represented in plain text with unique codepoint. Va from several modern-use scripts can also be found in legacy encodings, such as ISCII.

References

 Conjuncts are identified by IAST transliteration, except aspirated consonants are indicated with a superscript "h" to distinguish from an unaspirated cononant + Ha, and the use of the IPA "ŋ" and "ʃ" instead of the less dinstinctive "ṅ" and "ś".

Indic letters